The High Sheriff of Queen's County was the British Crown's judicial representative in Queen's County, Ireland (now County Laois), Ireland from the 16th century until 1922, when the office was abolished in the new Free State and replaced by the office of Offaly County Sheriff. The sheriff had judicial, electoral, ceremonial and administrative functions and executed High Court Writs. In 1908, an Order in Council made the Lord-Lieutenant the Sovereign's prime representative in a county and reduced the High Sheriff's precedence. However, the sheriff retained his responsibilities for the preservation of law and order in the county. The usual procedure for appointing the sheriff from 1660 onwards was that three persons were nominated at the beginning of each year from the county and the Lord Lieutenant then appointed his choice as High Sheriff for the remainder of the year. Often the other nominees were appointed as under-sheriffs. Sometimes a sheriff did not fulfil his entire term through death or other event and another sheriff was then appointed for the remainder of the year. The dates given hereunder are the dates of appointment. All addresses are in Queen's County (County Laois) unless stated otherwise.

High Sheriffs of Queen's County
1579: Robert Bowen of Ballyadams
1593: Terence O'Dempsey, 1st Viscount Clanmalier
1623: Barnaby or Brian Oge Dunn of Brittas
1627: Sir Walter Crosbie, 1st Baronet
1637: Gerald Fitzgerald of Tymogue and Moret and Loughcurran
1639: Edward Brereton
1663: Thomas Pigott of Capard
1676: Samuel Preston of Emo
1677: Edward Brereton
1689: Sir Gregory Byrne, 1st Baronet
1704: Gerald Fitzgerald of Coolanowle
1712: Robert Pigott of Capard
1719: Edmond Butler
1732: Lewis Moore I
1736: Lewis Moore of Cremorgan
1753: Sir John Parnell

George III, 1760–1820
1760: Lewis Moore II of Durrow 
1763: Stephen Cassan of Sheffield House
1764:
1772: Richard Croasdaile of Rynn
1773:
1779: Stewart Weldon
1780: John Brereton
1782: Jonathan Chetwode of Woodbrook
1782: John Adair of Rath
1783: Matthew Cassan of Sheffield House
1784: Henry Moore of Cremorgan
1785: Thomas Fitz-Gerald of Corbolly
1786:
1787:
1790: Edward Dunne of Brittas
1791: Charles Henry Coote of Forest Lodge
1792: Sir John Allen Johnson, 1st Baronet, later Sir John Allen Johnson-Walsh, 1st Baronet
1794: John or George Hartpole
1795: Joshua Kemmis of Knightstown
1799: Thomas Murray Prior (1773-1854)
1800: Sir Erasmus Dixon Borrowes, 6th  Baronet
1801: Richard Warburton of Garryhinch
1802:
1804: Coghran Palmer
1805: John Bland
1806: Robert Laurenson
1807: Gilbert fitz Gerald
1808: Sir George Pigott
1809: Thomas Cosby of Stradbally Hall
1810: Frederick Thompson
1811: Lancelot Croasdaile of Rynn
1812: John Alien Johnston-Walsh
1813: Hon Lord Sidney Osborne
1814: Lord Henry Seymour Moore
1815: Charles White of Charleville
1816: James White of Aghavoe
1817: Sir Walter Dixon Borrowes, 7th Baronet
1818: Robert White of Old Park (Grantston Manor)
1819: Sir Robert Staples
1820: Hugh Aldborough-Bowen

George IV, 1820–1830
1821: Pierce Moore
1822: George Adair of Rath
1823: Hon. Lionel Dawson
1824: Henry Smith, of Mount Henry
1825: Edward John Johnson-Walsh, later Sir Edward Johnson-Walsh, 2nd Baronet  of Ballykilcavan.
1827: Hon. John Vesey, of Abbeyleix
1828: Lewis Moore III
1829: John Warburton of Garryhinch

William IV, 1830–1837
1831: William Cope Cooper of Cooper's Hill
1832: Thomas Kemmis of Shaen Castle and Straboe
1834: Thomas Phillips Cosby of Stradbally Hall
1835: John Pigott of Cappard, Mountmellick
1836: John Fitzpatrick, 1st Baron Castletown of Upper Ossory

Victoria, 1837–1901
1839: Sir Anthony Weldon, 4th Baronet of Rahan, Ballylinan
1842: Edmund Staples of Dunmore
1843: Matthew Sheffield Cassan of Sheffield House
1845: Horace William Noel Rochfort, of Clogrenan
1846: Chidley Coote of Huntingdon, Portarlington
1848: J.H. Leckie of Coolbrook, Creetyard
1849: Richard Warburton of Garryhinch, Portarlington
1850: Henry D. Carden of Rathmanna, Maryborough
1852: William Gilbert Kemmis of Ballinacor
1852: Michael James Sweetman of Lamberton Park
1854: John Allen Johnson-Walsh, later Sir (John) Allen Johnson-Walsh, 4th Baronet
1855: John Croasdaile of Rynn
1856: Henry Jeffery Flower, 6th Viscount Ashbrook
1857: James Butler of Lamberton Park
1858: John Grace of Gracefield, Athy
1859: Edmund Gerald Dease of Rath House
1860: Thomas Kemmis of Shaen
1861: Sir Anthony Crossdill Weldon, 5th Baronet
1862: M.J.Sweetman of Lamberton Park, Maryborough.
1863: Robert Ashworth Godolphin Cosby of Stradbally Hall
1865: Edward Skeffington Randal Smyth of Mount Henry
1869: Richard Warburton of Garryhinch
1870: James W. Butler Scott of Annegrove Abbey, Mountrath
1871: Mathew Villiers Sankey Morton of Little Island, Co. Tipperary
1873: Robert Hamilton Hamilton-Stubber of Moyne and Castle Fleming.
1875: William Young
1876: Bernard Edward Barnaby Fitzpatrick, 2nd Baron Castletown of Upper Ossory.
1877:
1878: Francis Plunkett Dunne of Brittas.
1880: Sir Erasmus Dixon Borrowes, 9th Baronet.
1881: William Duckett of Duckett's Grove.
1882: Robert Edward Reeves of Morenane, Co. Limerick, and Skeard, Co. Kilkenny
1883: Henry Moore of Cremorgan.
1884: John Michael Sweetman-Powell of Lamberton Park.
1886: Eyre Coote.
1886: William Gilbert of Killeen, Portarlington.
1888: Sir Robert Edward Pigott of Capard.
1889:
1891: Sir Hutcheson Poë, 1st Baronet of Heywood, Ballinakill.
1892: Sir Percy Raymond Grace, 4th Baronet of Boley.
1893: Standish Grady John Parker-Hutchinson of Timoney Park and Castle Lough, Tipperary.
1895: Charles Joseph Blake
1897: Sir Algernon Coote, 11th Baronet.
1900: Sir Hunt Henry Allen Johnson-Walsh, 5th Baronet.

Edward VII, 1901–1910
1902: Matthew Henry Franks of Westfield.
1904: Joseph Henry Lachlan White of Gracefield.
1905: Henry Charles White of Charleville.
1906: Sir Anthony Arthur Weldon, 6th Baronet.
1907: Sir Valentine Raymond Grace, 5th Baronet.
1908: Robert F.H. White.
1909: William Hovenden Ffolliott of Tierernane Lodge.

George V, 1910–1936
1910:
1911: Leigh Sadleir Stoney of Forrest.
1912: Humphrey Loftus Bland of Blandsfort.
1913:
1920: Llowarch Robert Flower, 9th Viscount Ashbrook of Castle Durrow. 
1921: Isidore Blake.

References

 
Queen's County